Esteban Luis Yan (born June 22, 1975) is a Dominican former professional baseball pitcher. He played in all or parts of 11 seasons in Major League Baseball.

Early years
Yan was originally signed by the Atlanta Braves as an amateur free agent in 1990. He was traded along with Tony Tarasco and Roberto Kelly from the Braves to the Montreal Expos for Marquis Grissom on April 6, 1995. After spending time in the minor leagues, he made his major league debut with the Baltimore Orioles on May 20, 1996.

Professional career
Yan made his major league debut on May 20, 1996 with the Baltimore Orioles. He appeared in just four games with the Orioles that season while making just 3 appearances the following season. In 1998, Yan pitched for the Tampa Bay Devil Rays. In 64 games, he posted an ERA of 3.86 in  innings. In 1999, his ERA ballooned to 5.90 in 50 games. In 2000, Yan pitched between the rotation and the bullpen, appearing in 43 games while starting 20 of them. He was 7–8 in  innings.

On June 4, 2000, Yan hit a home run in his first major league at-bat, on the first pitch. His next plate appearance resulted in a sacrifice bunt, which does not count as an official at bat. In his only other career plate appearance (on June 30, 2003, as a member of the St. Louis Cardinals), he hit a single, giving him a 1.000 batting average and a 2.500 slugging percentage.

In the 2001 season, Yan served as closer for the Devil Rays, saving 22 games in 54 appearances. Yan began the 2002 season as the Devil Rays closer before being removed of the role during the season, he finished with a record of 7–8 in 55 games with 19 saves. On December 26, 2002, Yan signed a one-year deal with the Texas Rangers. In 15 games, he was 0–1 with a 6.94 ERA. He was traded to the St. Louis Cardinals on May 26, 2003, for a minor league outfielder and cash. In 2004, Yan pitched for the Detroit Tigers. He rebounded from the previous three seasons, as his ERA sat at a career-low 3.83 in a career-high 69 appearances.

In 2005, Yan pitched for the Angels. He was 1–1 in 49 games. In 2006, he began the season with the Angels before being traded to the Cincinnati Reds on May 30.

Asia
Yan spent the 2007 season as a pitcher for the Hanshin Tigers of Nippon Professional Baseball's Central League. In 2008, Yan rejoined the Orioles organization, but this time with its minor league affiliate the Norfolk Tides. Yan was released on July 18, 2008. He signed with SK Wyverns of the Korean Baseball League in July 2008 and spent the rest of the season with them.

Mexico
Yan spent the first half of 2009 pitching for the Bridgeport Bluefish, an unaffiliated minor league team in the Atlantic League. On August 11, 2009, Yan signed a minor league contract with the Florida Marlins and was assigned to the New Orleans Zephyrs. However, he failed the physical and stayed with Bridgeport. He signed with the Diablos Rojos del México to start 2010, then returned to the Bluefish, by whom he was activated on August 17. He returned to the Bluefish in 2011, splitting the season between Bridgeport and the Vaqueros Laguna of the Mexican League. He signed with the Saraperos de Saltillo for the 2012 season.

Television
Yan is the first member of the Tampa Bay Rays to be named on The Simpsons. In the March 16, 2003, episode entitled "C. E. D'oh!," Bart Simpson exclaims "Look at me! I'm Tomokazu Ohka of the Montreal Expos!" while playing baseball, to which Milhouse replies "Well, I'm Esteban Yan of the Tampa Bay Devil Rays!", referencing the relative obscurity of the two pitchers and their respective teams.

See also

List of Major League Baseball players with a home run in their first major league at bat

References

External links

1975 births
Living people
Baltimore Orioles players
Bowie Baysox players
Bridgeport Bluefish players
Cincinnati Reds players
Danville Braves players
Detroit Tigers players
Diablos Rojos del México players
Dominican Republic expatriate baseball players in Japan
Dominican Republic expatriate baseball players in Mexico
Dominican Republic expatriate baseball players in South Korea
Dominican Republic expatriate baseball players in the United States
Dominican Republic people of Haitian descent
Hanshin Tigers players
KBO League pitchers

Los Angeles Angels players
Macon Braves players
Major League Baseball pitchers
Major League Baseball players from the Dominican Republic
Mexican League baseball pitchers
Nippon Professional Baseball pitchers
Norfolk Tides players
Omaha Royals players
Orlando Rays players
Rochester Red Wings players
Saraperos de Saltillo players
Sportspeople of Haitian descent
SSG Landers players
St. Louis Cardinals players
St. Petersburg Devil Rays players
Sultanes de Monterrey players
Tampa Bay Devil Rays players
Texas Rangers players
Vaqueros Laguna players
West Palm Beach Expos players